John of Ibelin (died 1264), often called John II, was the Lord of Beirut from 1254, named after his grandfather John I, the famous "Old Lord of Beirut", and son of Balian of Ibelin, who surrendered Jerusalem to Saladin in 1187. His parents were Balian of Beirut and Eschiva, daughter of Walter of Montbéliard and Burgundia of Cyprus.

Biography
John inherited the Lordship of Beirut from Hugh of Ibelin. In 1258, by "manipulat[ing] the complex regency laws", John and his compatriot John of Jaffa, succeeded in aligning the feudatories of Jerusalem with the Republic of Venice against that of Genoa in the War of Saint Sabas. He took part in a very large raid alongside the Templars into Galilee in 1260. They were defeated at the camp near Tiberias in a route by some Turcomen and John was taken captive along with John of Gibelet, James Vidal, and Thomas Bérard, Grand Master of the Knights Templar. His ransom alone was 20,000 bezants.

John married Alice de la Roche, daughter of Duke Guy I of Athens. They had: 
Isabelle 1252–1282/83, lady of Beirut, who married Hugh II of Cyprus; the marriage was not consummated, then Haymo Létrange, Nicolas l'Alleman and William Barlais.
Eschive 1253–1312, lady of Beirut, who married Humphrey de Montfort, lord of Tyre and Guy constable of Cyprus.

References

Sources

Christians of the Crusades
1264 deaths
House of Ibelin
Year of birth unknown
History of Beirut
Prisoners of war
13th-century monarchs in the Middle East